Zhang Yichun (born 1932) is a Chinese financial economist and the first winner of Lifetime Achievement Award of China Financial Discipline. He currently serves as Dean of the Institute of Finance at Xiamen University.

His research areas includes stock market, money theory and commercial banking. Although in his 80s, Zhang is still active in academia and has given a number of talks and lectures on FinTech.

Zhang's popular college-level textbook Financial Markets is highly influential among Chinese finance students.

References

Living people
1932 births
Financial economists
People's Republic of China economists
Academic staff of Xiamen University
Economists from Fujian
Writers from Fuzhou
People's Republic of China writers
Educators from Fujian
People from Lianjiang County